Vangal Krishnamachari Thiruvenkatachari (30 January 1904 – 23 January 1984) was an Indian lawyer who served as the Advocate-General of Madras State from 1951 to 1964. He was the eldest son of Indian civil servant Sir V. T. Krishnamachari.
It was a letter written by Vangal Krishnamachari Thiruvenkatachari that became the foundation of Ninth Schedule to the Constitution of India.²

Early life and education 

Thiruvenkatachari was born in Srirangam to V. T. Krishnamachari and his wife, Rangammal, on 30 January 1904. He was the second child and the eldest son of the couple. 

Thiruvenkatachari was educated at Presidency College, Madras and studied law at the Madras Law College. On completion of his education, Thiruvenkatachari worked as a junior under S. Srinivasa Iyengar and Sir Alladi Krishnaswami Ayyar. In 1950, the newly constituted Republic of India consulted him on the Companies Act.

Family 
Thiruvenkatachari married Padmini (1910–1995). The couple had two children:

 Sita Narasimhan
 T. Krishnan

References 
 Vijayaraghavan.
 2 Granville Austin, Working A Democratic Constitution, The Indian Experience, Oxford University Press (1999),p.85.

1904 births
1984 deaths
Presidency College, Chennai alumni
20th-century Indian lawyers
Advocates General for Tamil Nadu